Pryteria apicella is a moth in the family Erebidae. It was described by Embrik Strand in 1919. It is found in Bolivia.

References

Moths described in 1919
Phaegopterina